Paul Claudel (6 August 1868 – 23 February 1955) was a French poet, dramatist and diplomat, and the younger brother of the sculptor Camille Claudel. He was most famous for his verse dramas, which often convey his devout Catholicism.

Early life
He was born in Villeneuve-sur-Fère (Aisne), into a family of farmers and government officials. His father, Louis-Prosper, dealt in mortgages and bank transactions. His mother, the former Louise Cerveaux, came from a Champagne family of Catholic farmers and priests. Having spent his first years in Champagne, he studied at the lycée of Bar-le-Duc and at the Lycée Louis-le-Grand in 1881, when his parents moved to Paris.

An unbeliever in his teenage years, Claudel experienced a conversion at age 18 on Christmas Day 1886 while listening to a choir sing Vespers in the cathedral of Notre Dame de Paris: "In an instant, my heart was touched, and I believed." He remained an active Catholic for the rest of his life. In addition, he discovered Arthur Rimbaud's book of poetry Illuminations. He worked towards "the revelation through poetry, both lyrical and dramatic, of the grand design of creation".

Claudel studied at the Paris Institute of Political Studies.

Diplomat
The young Claudel considered entering a monastery, but instead had a career in the French diplomatic corps, in which he served from 1893 to 1936.

Claudel was first vice-consul in New York (April 1893), and later in Boston (December 1893). He was French consul in China during the period 1895 to 1909, with time in Shanghai (June 1895). On a break in 1900, he spent time at  Ligugé Abbey, but his proposed entry to the Benedictine Order was postponed. 

Claudel returned to China as vice-consul in Fuzhou (October 1900). He had a further break in France in 1905–6, when he married. He was one of a group of writers enjoying the support and patronage of Philippe Berthelot of the Foreign Ministry, who became a close friend; others were Jean Giraudoux, Paul Morand and Saint-John Perse. Because of his position in the Diplomatic Corps, at the beginning of his career Claudel published either anonymously or under a pseudonym, "since permission to publish was needed from the Ministry of Foreign Affairs".:11 

For that reason, Claudel remained rather obscure as an author to 1909, unwilling to ask permission to publish under his own name because the permission might not be granted.:11 In that year, the founding group of the Nouvelle Revue Française (NRF), and in particular his friend André Gide, were keen to recognise his work. Claudel sent them, for the first issue, the poem Hymne du Sacre-Sacrement, to fulsome praise from Gide, and it was published under his name. He had not sought permission to publish, and there was a furore in which he was criticised. Attacks based on his religious views were in February also affecting the production of one of his plays.:15–17 Bertholet's advice was to ignore the critics.:18 note 42 The affair began a long collaboration of the NRF with Claudel.:12

Claudel also wrote extensively about China, with a definitive version of his Connaissance de l'Est published in 1914 by Georges Crès and Victor Segalen. In his final posting to China, he was consul in Tianjin (1906–1909).

In a series of European postings to the outbreak of World War I, Claudel was in Prague (December 1909), Frankfurt am Main (October 1911), and Hamburg (October 1913). At this period he was interested in the theatre festival at Hellerau, which put on one of his plays, and the ideas of Jacques Copeau.

Claudel was in Rome (1915–1916), ministre plénipotentiaire in Rio de Janeiro (1917–1918), Copenhagen (1920), ambassador in Tokyo (1921–1927), Washington, D.C. (1928–1933, Dean of the Diplomatic Corps in 1933) and Brussels (1933–1936). While he served in Brazil during World War I he supervised the continued provision of food supplies from South America to France. His secretaries during the Brazil mission included Darius Milhaud,  who wrote incidental music to a number of Claudel's plays.

Later life

In 1935 Claudel retired to Brangues in Dauphiné, where he had bought the château in 1927. He still spent winters in Paris.

During World War II Claudel made his way to Algeria in 1940, after the Battle of France, and offered to serve Free France. Not having a response to the offer, he returned to Brangues. He supported the Vichy regime, but disagreed with Cardinal Alfred Baudrillart's policy of collaboration with Nazi Germany.

Close to home, Paul-Louis Weiller, married to Claudel's daughter-in-law's sister, was arrested by the Vichy government in October 1940. Claudel went to Vichy to intercede for him, to no avail; Weiller escaped (with Claudel's assistance, the authorities suspected) and fled to New York. Claudel wrote in December 1941 to Isaïe Schwartz, expressing his opposition to the Statut des Juifs enacted by the regime. The Vichy authorities responded by having Claudel's house searched and keeping him under observation. 

Claudel was elected to the Académie française on 4 April 1946, replacing Louis Gillet. It followed a rejection in 1935, considered somewhat scandalous, when Claude Farrère was preferred. He was nominated for the Nobel Prize in Literature in six different years.

Work

Claudel often referred to Stéphane Mallarmé as his teacher. His poetic has been seen as Mallarmé's, with the addition of the idea of the world as a revelatory religious text. He rejected traditional prosody, developing the verset claudelien, his own form of free verse. It was within the orbit of experimentation by followers of Walt Whitman, impressive for Claudel, of whom Charles Péguy and André Spire were two others working on a form of verset. The influence of the Latin Vulgate has been disputed by Jean Grosjean.

The best known of his plays are Le Partage de Midi ("The Break of Noon", 1906), L'Annonce faite à Marie ("The Tidings Brought to Mary", 1910) focusing on the themes of sacrifice, oblation and sanctification through the tale of a young medieval French peasant woman who contracts leprosy, and Le Soulier de Satin ("The Satin Slipper", 1931). The last is an exploration of human and divine love and longing, set in the Spanish empire of the siglo de oro. It was staged at the Comédie-Française in 1943. Jeanne d'Arc au Bûcher ("Joan of Arc at the Stake", 1939) was an oratorio with music by Arthur Honegger. The settings of his plays tended to be romantically distant, medieval France or sixteenth-century Spanish South America. He used scenes of passionate, obsessive human love. The complexity, structure and scale of the plays meant that a positive reception of Claudel's drama by audiences was long delayed. His final dramatic work, L'Histoire de Tobie et de Sara, was first produced by Jean Vilar for the Festival d'Avignon in 1947.

As well as his verse dramas, Claudel also wrote lyric poetry. A major example is the Cinq Grandes Odes (Five Great Odes, 1907).

Views and reputation
Claudel was a conservative of the old school, sharing the antisemitism of conservative France,. He addressed a poem ("Paroles au Maréchal," "Words to the Marshal") after the defeat of France in 1940, commending Marshal Pétain for picking up and salvaging France's broken, wounded body. As a Catholic, he could not avoid a sense of satisfaction at the fall of the anti-clerical French Third Republic.

His diaries make clear his consistent contempt for Nazism (condemning it as early as 1930 as "demonic" and "wedded to Satan," and referring to communism and Nazism as "Gog and Magog"). He wrote an open letter to the World Jewish Conference in 1935, condemning the Nuremberg Laws as "abominable and stupid." His support for Charles de Gaulle and the Free French forces culminated in his victory ode addressed to de Gaulle when Paris was liberated in 1944.

The British poet W. H. Auden acknowledged the importance of Paul Claudel in his poem "In Memory of W. B. Yeats" (1939). Writing about Yeats, Auden says in lines 52–55 (from the originally published version, then excised by Auden in a later revision):

George Steiner, in The Death of Tragedy, called Claudel one of the three "masters of drama" in the 20th century, with Henry de Montherlant and Bertolt Brecht.

Family
While in China, Claudel had a long affair with Rosalie Vetch née Ścibor-Rylska (1871–1951), wife of Francis Vetch (1862–1944) and granddaughter of Hamilton Vetch. Claudel knew Francis Vetch through his diplomatic work, and had met Rosalie on a sea voyage out from Marseille to Hong Kong in 1900. She had four children, and was pregnant with Claudel's child when the affair ended in February 1905. She married in 1907 Jan Willem Lintner. Louise Marie Agnes Vetch (1905–1996), born in Brussels, was Claudel's daughter by Rosalie. Francis Vetch and Claudel had caught up with Rosalie at a railway station on the German border in 1905, a meeting at which Rosalie signalled that her relationship with Claudel was over.

Claudel married on 15 March 1906 Reine Sainte-Marie Perrin (1880–1973). She was the daughter of Louis Sainte-Marie Perrin (1835–1917), an architect from Lyon known for completing the Basilica of Notre-Dame de Fourvière. They had two sons and three daughters.

Treatment of his sister

Claudel committed his sister Camille to a psychiatric hospital in March 1913, where she remained for the last 30 years of her life, visiting her seven times in those 30 years. Records show that while she did have mental lapses, she was clear-headed while working on her art. Doctors tried to convince the family that she need not be in the institution, but still they kept her there. 

The story forms the subject of a novel by Michèle Desbordes, La Robe bleue, The Blue Dress. Jean-Charles de Castelbajac wrote a song "La soeur de Paul" for Mareva Galanter, 2010.

See also
 L'Histoire de Tobie et de Sara
 L'Annonce faite à Marie, film adaptation
 Lycée Claudel, a French language high school in Ottawa, Canada, named after him
 Camille Claudel, 1988 film
 Camille Claudel 1915, 2013 film

References

Sources
 Thody, P.M.W. "Paul Claudel", in The Fontana Biographical Companion to Modern Thought, eds. Bullock, Alan and Woodings, R.B., Oxford, 1983.
 Ayral-Clause, Odile, Camille Claudel, A Life, 2002.
 Ashley, Tim: "Evil Genius", The Guardian, 14 August 2004.
 Price-Jones, David, "Jews, Arabs and French Diplomacy: A Special Report", Commentary, 22 May 2005, https://web.archive.org/web/20051218141558/http://www.benadorassociates.com/article/15043
 Album Claudel. Iconographie choisie et annotée par Guy Goffette. Bibliothèque de la Pléiade. Éditions Gallimard, 2011. . (Illustrated biography.)

External links

 Paul-claudel.net (in French)

1868 births
1955 deaths
People from Aisne
French Roman Catholics
Sciences Po alumni
Converts to Roman Catholicism from atheism or agnosticism
Ambassadors of France to Belgium
Ambassadors of France to Japan
Ambassadors of France to the United States
Deans of the Diplomatic Corps to the United States
French Catholic poets

19th-century French dramatists and playwrights
20th-century French dramatists and playwrights
19th-century French poets
Lycée Louis-le-Grand alumni
Members of the Académie Française
Roman Catholic writers
19th-century French diplomats
20th-century French diplomats